The 2004 Indian Ocean earthquake and tsunami occurred on Sunday, December 26, 2004. The earthquake itself, with a moment magnitude of around 9.1-9.3, devastated Aceh Province, Indonesia, while the tsunami affected countries all around the Indian Ocean. Nations which were affected are listed below in alphabetical order. For detailed information about each country affected by the earthquake and tsunami, see their individual articles. Countries with a smaller number of casualties, as well as those that lost citizens who were travelling abroad, are listed further on in the article.

Countries suffering major casualties and damage

  Effect on India
10,749 casualties were confirmed on 27 January 2008, most of them in the Indian states of Andhra Pradesh and Tamil Nadu. There were 5,640 people missing, nearly all of them on the Andaman and Nicobar Islands.  by 1,458, and the number of missing by 2,927 on the Andaman and Nicobar Islands.

  Effect on Indonesia
Indonesia's Ministry of Health confirmed 131,028 deaths on June 18, 2005, mainly in the northern province Aceh of the island Sumatra. Some 37,000 people are missing.

  Effect on Malaysia
Despite its proximity to the incident, Malaysia escaped the kind of damage that struck countries thousands of miles further away (most of its western coast is shielded by Sumatra). The estimated number of deaths is 75 with five others missing.

  Effect on the Maldives
In the Maldives, an estimated 108 people were killed and 26 reported missing and presumed dead.

  Effect on Myanmar
Independent media reports 90 people killed in Myanmar due to the tsunami. The official death toll is 61. Witnesses in Myanmar estimate up to 600 deaths.

  Effect on Somalia

  Effect on Sri Lanka
Sri Lankan authorities report 31,229 confirmed deaths, and 4,093 people missing. Other authorities are speaking from 38,940 combined dead and missing people. The south and east coasts were worst hit. Nearly 2,000 of the dead were on the Queen of the Sea holiday train destroyed by the tsunami. One and a half million people were displaced from their homes, and many orphaned or separated from their families.

  Effect on Thailand
The Thai government reports 5,395 confirmed deaths, 8,457 injuries and 2,817 missing on 20 June 2005. Damage was confined to the six southern provinces facing the Andaman Sea. The Thai government was keen to point out that the rest of the country was operating normally, and that even some resorts in the south had re-opened.

Source:

Countries suffering some casualties and damage

Countries suffering damage only

Countries/territories that lost citizens while abroad

A – J

K – R

S – Z

References

External links
 Non-nationals: Hundreds dead, thousands missing – CNN
 Asia Quake: Trace the Missing – BBC News
 Tsunami tragedy: Your appeals – CNN

History of Asia
2004 in Asia